The Port of Brussels is an inland port at a distance of 120 km from the sea. It is accessible for ships up to 4,500 tonnes and push towing convoys up to 9,000 tonnes. Via the Brussels–Scheldt Maritime Canal even sea-going vessels (fluviomaritime and coasters) can reach the outer port, and through the Brussels–Charleroi Canal the transit to Wallonia is assured. The port is located in the City of Brussels in the Brussels-Capital Region.

On the limited surface area (64 ha) there are approximately 300 companies, which account for about 13,000 jobs.

History

The current Port of Brussels that lies north from the actual city centre finds its origin in the construction of the Willebroek Canal, which was opened in 1561 for shipping. Over the years, within the city walls, different docks were excavated, which only were muted by the end of the 19th century because they then had by then became insufficient, and the port company located outside the Pentagon began to develop. The street names along the former docks, however, still retain in their names the memory of their former function, so the location remains recognisable even today.

There were six docks in total, three docks at the Rivage Gate where the channel entered the city walls, that were aligned in longitudinal direction, and on each of them another dock followed in transverse direction:
 Grand Bassin and Bassin du Chantier (Dutch: Groot Dok and Werfdok)
 Bassin des Barques and Bassin de l'Entrepôt (Dutch: Schuitendok and Stapelhuisdok)
 Bassin des Marchands and Bassin de Saint-Cathérine (Dutch: Koopliedendok and Sint-Katelijnedok)

General information

The Port of Brussels was founded in 1993, as a result of the splitting of the N.V. Zeekanaal in a Flemish and a Brussels institution, five years after the authority over the ports in Belgium was transferred to the regions. The new autonomy in 1993 immediately led to new dynamism and growth in the results. In the twenty years prior, the traffic of 14.4 million tonnes in 1974 had shrunk to less than a third. Since 1993, the traffic has increased by 60% again.

In the port, more than 24 million tonnes of goods are traded yearly, most via railway and road transport, and over 6.6 million tonnes via the waterway transit (as of 2016). The main shareholders are the Brussels-Capital Region (56%) and the City of Brussels (35%). Together with the Brussels-based investment company Brinfin (3.9%) and some other municipalities (5.1%) they indicate the members of the Board of Directors. The first Director General was Steven Vanackere (1993–2000). Nowadays, Mohammed Jabour is the chairman of the Board of Directors, and Alfred Moens the General Manager. The current competent minister is Rudi Vervoort, Minister-President of the Brussels-Capital Region.

External links
 Port of Brussels

See also
 Tour & Taxis
 Ric's Art Boat

References

Further reading
 
 
 

Brussels
Geography of Brussels
Transport in Brussels